Albu is a surname. Notable people with the surname include:

 Austen Albu (1903–1994), British politician
 Emily Albu (born 1945), American classics scholar
 Florența Albu (1934–2000), Romanian poet
 George Albu (1857–1935), mining magnate in the diamond and gold industries of South Africa
 Gheorghe Albu (1909–1974), Romanian football player

See also 

 Albu baronets, a title in the Baronetage of the United Kingdom

Romanian-language surnames